Iranian Super League may refer to:

 Futsal Super League
 Iranian Basketball Super League
 Iranian Volleyball Super League